Eurymeloides bicincta, commonly known as the two-lined gum-treehopper, is a leafhopper in the family Cicadellidae. It is the type species of the genus Eurymeloides. It is a sap-sucking insect and is found on gum-trees in its native southeastern Australia.

Description
The adult is wedge-shaped and is black with large orange eyes and white lines on its wings. The nymphs are orange.

Ecology
Eurymeloides bicincta is found on Eucalyptus trees where both nymphs and adults have piercing mouthparts and suck the sap. The excess fluid is secreted and is fed upon by ants which are often found associated with the leafhoppers. The ants do not harm the leafhoppers but may drive off potential predators.

Some sand wasps in the tribe Nyssonini prey on this leafhopper, carrying off adults to provision the cells in which they lay their eggs.

References

Eurymelinae
Hemiptera of Australia
Insects described in 1842
Taxa named by Wilhelm Ferdinand Erichson